Nigoherm Rural LLG is a local-level government (LLG) of Manus Province, Papua New Guinea.

Wards
01. Pateku
02. Lau Island
03. Pihon
04. Liot
05. Luf
06. Amik

References

Local-level governments of Manus Province